French Horns for My Lady is an album by horn player Julius Watkins which was originally released on the Philips label in 1962.

Track listing
 "Temptation" (Nacio Herb Brown, Arthur Freed) – 3:10
 "Clair de Lune" (Claude Debussy) – 2:56
 "September Song" (Kurt Weill, Maxwell Anderson) – 2:52
 "Catana" (Alfred Newman, Eddie DeLange) – 2:55
 "I'm a Fool to Want You" (Jack Wolf, Joel Herron. Frank Sinatra) – 3:00
 "Speak Low" (Weill, Ogden Nash) – 4:08
 "Nuages" (Django Reinhardt) – 3:42
 "The Boy Next Door" (Hugh Martin, Ralph Blane) – 3:10
 "Mood Indigo" (Duke Ellington, Barney Bigard, Irving Mills) – 3:15
 "Home (When Shadows Fall)" (Harry Clarkson, Geoffrey Clarkson, Peter van Steeden) – 2:57

Personnel
Julius Watkins – bandleader, French horn
Roger "King" Mozian – trumpet
Gunther Schuller, Bob Northern, James Buffington, John Barrows – French horn
Jay McAllister – tuba
Eddie Costa – piano, vibraphone
George Duvivier – bass
Ray Barretto – congas
Martha Zena Flowers – vocals (tracks 4 & 7)
Billy Byers – arranger

References

Philips Records albums
Julius Watkins albums
1962 albums
Albums arranged by Billy Byers
Albums produced by Quincy Jones